Kretzschmaria is a genus of fungi in the family Xylariaceae. The genus, circumscribed by Swedish mycologist Elias Magnus Fries in 1849, contains about 30 species that collectively have a widespread distribution. Fossils of Kretzschmaria have been found in the 12 million year old rocks from central England.

Species
Kretzschmaria albogrisea
Kretzschmaria argentinensis
Kretzschmaria aspinifera
Kretzschmaria bengalensis
Kretzschmaria cetrarioides
Kretzschmaria chardoniana
Kretzschmaria clavus
Kretzschmaria colensoi
Kretzschmaria curvirima
Kretzschmaria deusta
Kretzschmaria eriodendri
Kretzschmaria guyanensis
Kretzschmaria knysnana
Kretzschmaria lucidula
Kretzschmaria macrosperma
Kretzschmaria megalospora
Kretzschmaria micropus
Kretzschmaria milleri
Kretzschmaria neocaledonica
Kretzschmaria orientalis
Kretzschmaria parvistroma
Kretzschmaria pavimentosa
Kretzschmaria phoenicis
Kretzschmaria rehmii
Kretzschmaria sandvicense
Kretzschmaria sigmoidirima
Kretzschmaria tuckeri
Kretzschmaria varians
Kretzschmaria verrucosa
Kretzschmaria zelandica
Kretzschmaria zonata

References

Ascomycota genera
Xylariales